Kallur , is a town and union council of Mianwali District in the Punjab province of Pakistan. It is part of Isakhel Tehsil and is located at 32°44'33N 71°15'54E and has an altitude of 203 m (669 ft).

References

Union councils of Mianwali District
Populated places in Mianwali District